The Pericopes of Henry II (Munich, Bavarian State Library, Clm 4452) is a luxurious medieval illuminated manuscript made for Henry II, the last Ottonian Holy Roman Emperor, made  1002–1012 AD. The manuscript, which is lavishly illuminated, is a product of the Liuthar circle of illuminators, who were working in the Benedictine Abbey of Reichenau, which housed a scriptorium and artists' workshop that has a claim to having been the largest and artistically most influential in Europe during the late 10th and early 11th centuries. An unrivalled series of liturgical manuscripts was produced at Reichenau under the highest patronage of Ottonian society. (Other centers include  scriptoria at Lorsch, Trier, and Regensburg.)

Unlike a gospel book, gospel pericopes contain only the passages from the gospels which are to be read during the liturgical year, making it easier for the priest celebrating Mass to find the gospel reading. It is 425 mm by 320 mm and has 206 vellum folios.

Style of the miniatures
The style of the "Liuthar group", unlike other schools in Ottonian art, departs further from rather than returning to classical traditions; it "carried transcendentalism to an extreme", with "marked schematization of the forms and colours", "flattened form, conceptualized draperies and expansive gesture". Backgrounds are often composed of bands of colour with a symbolic rather than naturalistic rationale, the size of figures reflects their importance, and in them  "emphasis is not so much on movement as in gesture and glance", with narrative scenes "presented as a quasi-liturgical act, dialogues of divinity".  The group were produced perhaps from the 990s to 1015 or later, and major manuscripts include the Munich Gospels of Otto III, the Bamberg Apocalypse, and a volume of biblical commentary there, and the Pericopes of Henry II, the best known and most extreme of the group, where "the figure-style has become more monumental, more rarified and sublime, at the same time thin in density, insubstantial, mere silhouettes of colour against a shimmering void". The group introduced the background of solid gold to Western illumination.

Notes

See also
Salzburg Pericopes

References
Beckwith, John.  Early Medieval Art: Carolingian, Ottonian, Romanesque, Thames & Hudson, 1964 (rev. 1969), 
Walther, Ingo F. and Norbert Wolf. Codices Illustres: The world's most famous illuminated manuscripts, 400 to 1600. Köln, TASCHEN, 2005.

External links
Bayerisches Staatsbibliothek: "Reichenau illumination" (in English)
Iconographic analysis of the miniatures in the Warburg Institute Iconographic Database, with links to the online facsimile of the Bayerische Staatsbibliothek

1000s books
1010s books
11th-century biblical manuscripts
11th-century illuminated manuscripts
Christian illuminated manuscripts
Ottonian illuminated manuscripts
Henry II, Holy Roman Emperor